The 1999 ANZ Tasmanian International was a women's tennis tournament played on outdoor hard courts at the Hobart International Tennis Centre in Hobart in Australia that was part of Tier IVb of the 1999 WTA Tour. It was the sixth edition of the tournament and was held from 11 through 16 January 1999.

Heading into the tournament, Swiss player Patty Schnyder was the defending champion but she didn't defend her singles title due to her playing in Sydney in that same week. In the singles final, Fifth-seeded Chanda Rubin won the title in straight sets over unseeded Italian player, Rita Grande and earned $16,000 first-prize money.

Entrants

Seeds

Other entrants
The following players received wildcards into the singles main draw:
  Annabel Ellwood
  Nicole Pratt

The following players received wildcards into the doubles main draw:
  Annabel Ellwood /  Nicole Pratt

The following players received entry from the singles qualifying draw:
  Els Callens
  Nana Miyagi
  Samantha Reeves
  Maureen Drake

The following player received entry as a lucky loser:
  Kristina Brandi

The following players received entry from the doubles qualifying draw:
  Lilia Osterloh /  Mashona Washington

The following players received entry as a lucky loser:
  Květa Hrdličková /  Tina Križan

Finals

Singles

 Chanda Rubin defeated  Rita Grande 6–2, 6–3
 It was Rubin's only singles title of the year and the 2nd of her career.

Doubles

 Mariaan de Swardt /  Elena Tatarkova defeated  Alexia Dechaume-Balleret /  Émilie Loit 6–1, 6–2

References

External links
 ITF tournament edition details
 Tournament draws

 
ANZ Tasmanian International
Tas
Hobart International